Balthazar Armas (Caracas, Venezuela, 1941 – 2015)  is considered one of the pioneers in the contemporary figurative art movement in Latin America, where the industrial and urban influence of his paintings makes them approachable and  distinguishable. His most recent work has a postmodern influence that reflects in the presence of social narrative, indigenism and social criticism in his paintings. His most recent series, "Andé andé" (2003), "Botanica" (2007), and "Sobre el Vuelo" (2007), transmit the energy and mysticism of the people and environment of the cultures of Latin America.

Born in Caracas, Venezuela, he started as a self-taught artist during the 1950s and participated in the movement of experimental theatre in Caracas at the Academy of Dramatic Art Carmen Antillano. A graduate student of the Neumann institute of graphic arts, and the Center of Graphic Studies (CEGRA) for engraving, Balthazar's first individual exhibitions go back to 1966. He has participated in numerous design, engraving and art exhibitions in Latin America, Europe and in the United States, including MOKA gallery in Chicago, Illinois.

His awards and recognitions includes the Pratt Institute, Havana biennial, IE in Norway, Library of Congress, Art Museum of the Americas in Washington D.C, IE Gracovia, Poland, Premio "Braulio Salazar" Salón de Artes Arturo Michelena, Venezuela, and more.

Education 

Self-taught Artist. 1953/58. Caracas.
Acting and Stage Scene. Academia de Arte Dramático Carmen Antillano. 1962/64. Caracas.
Drawing. Instituto Académico de Bellas Artes 62/66. Caracas.
Industrial Design. Instituto de Diseño, Fundación Newmann-INCE. 1967/70. Caracas.
Graphic Arts. Specialty: Engraving. Centro de Enseñanza Gráfica, CEGRA. 1978/80. Caracas.

Academic contributions 

CEGRA Centro de Enseñanza Gráfica, Caracas.
Language, Communication y Visual Thought. 1977.
Hand-made Paper Crafting. 1978.
Paper Conservation and Paper-based Art. 1979.
TAGA Taller de Artistas Gráficos Asociados, Caracas. Colografía. 1979
Museo de Arte Moderno de Latinoamérica (OEA) Washington DC. 1982.
The Path of Art in Latinoamérica

References

1941 births
Living people
Artists from Caracas
Venezuelan painters